Lycideopidae is an extinct family of therocephalians from the Late Permian and Early Triassic of South Africa.

Phylogeny
Below is a cladogram from Sigurdsen et al. (2012):

References

Baurioids
Lopingian first appearances
Early Triassic extinctions
Prehistoric therapsid families